Ded or DED may refer to:

 Ded (band), an American nu metal band from Tempe, Arizona
 Ded, Bishop of Vác, Hungarian 12th-century prelate
 Data element definition, associated with a data element within a data dictionary
 Dead End Derby, a roller derby league in Christchurch, New Zealand
 Death effector domain, a signalling pathway in cell biology
 DED Basketball Club, a Dutch basketball club
 Dedicated hosting service, a type of Internet hosting
 Dedua language, spoken in Papua New Guinea
 DeLand Municipal Airport, in DeLand, Florida, United States
 Department of Economic Development (disambiguation)
 Deutscher Entwicklungsdienst, German Development Service
 Directed Energy Deposition, ASTM International defined Additive Manufacturing Process 
 District electoral divisions, in Ireland, since 1996 termed electoral divisions
 Diyar-e-Dil, a Pakistani television series
 Doctor of Education (D.Ed.)
 Dog Eat Dog (disambiguation)
 Dog eat Doug, an American comic strip
 Double-ended dildo
 Dutch elm disease, a disease of elm trees
 Jolly Grant Airport, serving Dehradun, Uttarakhand, India
 Deferred Enforced Departure, an immigration status in the U.S. similar to Temporary Protected Status
 Dragging equipment detector, a type of defect detector
 Diabetic eye disease, also known as diabetic retinopathy
 Disjunctive embedded dependency a type of constraint on a relational database

See also 
 Dead (disambiguation)